Mexican Spitfire is a 1940 American comedy film starring Lupe Vélez.  She plays a hot-headed, fast-talking Mexican singer taken to New York for a radio gig, who decides she wants the ad agency man for herself. The film was the sequel of the film The Girl from Mexico (1939) and was the first of a film series of seven more films with the same title and main characters.

Story
Newlyweds Dennis (Donald Woods) and Carmelita (Lupe Vélez) have several obstacles to deal with in their new marriage: Carmelita's fiery Latin temper, a meddling aunt and a conniving ex-fiancee who is determined to break up their marriage.

Cast

 Lupe Vélez as Carmelita Fuentes
 Donald Woods as Dennis 'Denny' Lindsay
 Leon Errol as Uncle Matthew 'Matt' Lindsay
 Elisabeth Risdon as Aunt Della Lindsay
 Linda Hayes as Elizabeth Price
 Cecil Kellaway as Mr. Chummley
 Charles Coleman as Bosby - the Butler

Notes
First official entry in the series is a retread of The Girl from Mexico, but shifts focus from bland leading man Woods to hilarious Errol in dual role of Uncle Matt and the tipsy Lord Epping. The film was succeeded by another 6 films:

Mexican Spitfire Out West (1940)
The Mexican Spitfire's Baby (1941)
Mexican Spitfire at Sea (1942)
Mexican Spitfire Sees a Ghost (1942)
Mexican Spitfire's Elephant (1942)
Mexican Spitfire's Blessed Event (1943)

References

External links

 
 
 

1940 films
Films directed by Leslie Goodwins
RKO Pictures films
1940 comedy films
American comedy films
Films produced by Cliff Reid
American black-and-white films
Films scored by Paul Sawtell
1940s American films